Chris Tadrosse (born 10 September 1985) is an Australian footballer who plays for Bonnyrigg White Eagles.

Club career
He was part of Melbourne Victory's squad in the A-League, but was allowed to leave late in the club's inaugural year; having failed to make a real impact in his limited appearances and Melbourne having to rebuild after an unsuccessful season.

The first stop on his German adventure was with Oberliga Nordrhein league club KFC Uerdingen 05. After a short stay he moved to Bundesliga club Borussia Mönchengladbach. He made several appearances for the club's second team but was released at the end of the 2007–08 season.

On 1 October 2008, Tadrosse signed with the Central Coast Mariners after a trial period of one month as a short-term injury replacement for Dean Heffernan. In 2008, he had a short trial at English League Two side Port Vale.

Tadrosse joined new A-League club North Queensland Fury for their inaugural season in the competition, after signing with the club.

References

External links
North Queensland Fury profile

1985 births
Living people
Soccer players from Sydney
Australia youth international soccer players
Australia under-20 international soccer players
Australian expatriate soccer players
A-League Men players
National Premier Leagues players
Blacktown City FC players
Central Coast Mariners FC players
KFC Uerdingen 05 players
Melbourne Victory FC players
Northern Fury FC players
Bonnyrigg White Eagles FC players
New South Wales Institute of Sport alumni
Association football defenders
Australian soccer players